Klingsor (also Klinschor) is a magician in the Middle High German epic poem Parzival (c. 1200).

Named for Klingsor:
Klingsohr, character in  Heinrich von Ofterdingen by Novalis (1802) 
Klingsor, magician in Richard Wagner's opera Parsifal (1882)
Tristan Klingsor, pen name (c. 1895) of French poet  Léon Leclère (1874—1966)
Klingsor, painter and protagonist of Klingsor's Last Summer by Hermann Hesse (1919), again mentioned in Die Morgenlandfahrt (1932)
Klingsor by Friedrich Schnack (1922)
character in Der Graf von Saint-Germain by Alexander Lernet-Holenias (1948)
9511 Klingsor, a Main-belt Asteroid (1977)
Herr Klingsor by Otfried Preußler (1987)
Klingsor, code name of a Nazi scientist in Jorge Volpi's novel "In Search of Klingsor" (En busca de Klingsor, 1999)